The Nepal Revolutionary Students Union (abbr. NRSU and ) is the student wing of the Nepal Workers Peasants Party, a communist party in Nepal which follows Juche. The president of the NRSU is Prakash Gurung

History 
The NRSU was established in 1969 against the practices of the student movement of the time, which they saw as defeatist and unprincipled. 

The Sixth National Convention of NWPP (4 to 6 April 2014) adopted the Program of Peoples' Democracy as its strategic program (where peoples' democracy is seen as a step towards socialism), which was adopted by the NRSU.

In February 2004, the NRSU won the post of president in the Free Student Union elections at the Bhaktapur Multiple Campus. It won the same post two more times. In the last election, a female student from the NRSU was the first woman to win the post of an FSU chairperson in Nepal. The NRSU won minor posts in several other colleges.

See also 
 All Nepal National Free Students Union (Unified)
 Nepal Progressive Student Federation

References 

Student wings of political parties in Nepal
Student wings of communist parties
Students' unions in Nepal
Student organizations established in 1969
1969 establishments in Nepal